Huff Creek may refer to:

Huff Creek (Missouri), a tributary of the Nodaway River
Huff Creek (West Virginia), a tributary of the Guyandotte River

See also
Huff Run, a stream in Ohio